A three-part referendum was held in Switzerland on 21 October 1877. A federal law on working in factories was approved by voters, whilst a federal law on compensation for not serving in the military and a federal law on the political rights of settled and travelling people and the loss of rights for Swiss citizens were both rejected.

Background
The referendum was classed as an optional referendum, which meant that only a majority of the public vote was required for the proposals to be approve, as opposed to the mandatory referendums that required both a majority of voters and cantons to approve the proposals.

Results

Federal law on working in factories

Federal law on compensation for not serving in the military

Federal law on the political rights of settled and travelling people and on the loss of rights of Swiss citizens

References

1877 referendums
1877 in Switzerland
Referendums in Switzerland